The Pine Bank Covered Bridge is a historic covered bridge located at the Meadowcroft Museum of Rural Life in Studa, Pennsylvania. The bridge was built in 1871 and moved to its current location in 1962.

It is designated as a historic bridge by the Washington County History & Landmarks Foundation.

References

External links
[ National Register nomination form]

Covered bridges on the National Register of Historic Places in Pennsylvania
Covered bridges in Washington County, Pennsylvania
Bridges completed in 1962
National Register of Historic Places in Washington County, Pennsylvania
Road bridges on the National Register of Historic Places in Pennsylvania
Wooden bridges in Pennsylvania
King post truss bridges in the United States